Bloomingdale Senior High School is a public high school located in Valrico, Florida. Bloomingdale was established in 1987, three years after Gaither High School, and has its same architectural design. Bloomingdale's first graduating class was in 1989, since Hillborough County does not pull seniors from existing schools for new schools. The current principal is Marcos Rodriguez. The football stadium is named for the first principal, Charley Harris. The school colors are red and white with black trim.

Athletics
Sports offered include: golf, football, soccer, baseball, softball, wrestling, basketball, volleyball, lacrosse, swimming, flag football, cross country, tennis and track and field. Ice hockey, and bowling are club sports. Boys' sports teams are called the Bloomingdale Bulls, and girls' sports teams are called the Bloomingdale Lady Bulls.

The boys soccer team won state championships in '93, '95, and '98.

The girls soccer team won a state title in 2001 and was state runner up in 1992.

The cheerleading squad won state championships in 2008 and 2009.

The softball team won the state championship in 1993 and 2014.

Clubs and organizations
Bloomingdale Senior High School currently offers three types of clubs: special interest, academic/honor, and service clubs.

Notable alumni
Erin Andrews (1996): Fox NFL sportscaster
Beth Bauer: (1999) LPGA Professional golfer
Chad Bratzke: (1989) former National Football League player (Indianapolis Colts)
Mark Consuelos (1989): television soap opera star and husband of Live with Regis & Kelly star Kelly Ripa
Steve Freeman (1991): professional soccer player and coach
Funkghost (Alvin Augustus Harris): (1990) hip-hop artist/producer
Matt Good (2000): guitarist/vocalist of From First To Last/Destroy Rebuild Until God Shows
Agiye Hall (2021): American football wide receiver previously with the University of Alabama
Mike Heald (1990): professional soccer player
Debra Lafave (1998): Child rapist
Richie Martin (2012) MLB Professional Baseball Player Oakland Athletics
Alissa Nutting,  author and creative writing professor.

References

External links
Bloomingdale High School Website
Hillsborough County Public Schools

Educational institutions established in 1987
High schools in Hillsborough County, Florida
Public high schools in Florida
1987 establishments in Florida